Miss International 2003, the 43rd Miss International pageant, was held on October 8, 2003 at Radisson Miyako Hotel in Tokyo, Japan. Forty-five beauties from all over the world competed to win the coveted title held by Christina Sawaya of Lebanon. In the end, Goizeder Azúa of Venezuela won the title.

Results

Placements

Contestants

  – Catalina Rouiller
  – Falon Juliana Lopez
  – Carmen Muriel Cruz Claros
  – Carlessa Rubicínthia Macedo da Rocha
  – Katarzyna Dziedzic
  – Christiane Balmelli Fournier
  – Wang Chan
  – Isabel Sofia Cabrales Baquero
  – Merilyn Villalta Castro
  – Maja Uzarevic
  – Maria Pelekanou
  – Yodit Getahun
  – Suvi Paivikki Hartlin
  – Elodie Couffin
  – Aleksandra Vodjanikova
  – Apostolina Zaproydis
  – Ana Pamela Prado Diaz
  – Priscilla Chik Doi-Doi
  – Shonali Nagrani
  – Stavit Budin
  – Saeko Matsumi (松見早枝子)
  – Shin Ji-soo
  – Lorena Ruiz Martinez
  – Ester Tan
  – Nadine Cassar
  – Gabriela Ortiz
 Native American – Lana-la Trell Onque Henry
  – Amber Jean Peebles
  – Nwando Okwosa
  – Nancie Rae King Ripple
  – Jhezarie Games Javier
  – Dignelis Jiménez
  – Tatiana Chebotarevskaya
  – Andja Ratko Budimir
  – Berlin Koh Meng Yean
  – Simona Slobodnikova
  – Maria Carrillo Reyes
  – Pawina Bamrungrot
  – Amira Thabet
  – Gizem Kalyoncu
  – Veronika Dmitrievna Bondarenko
  – Gayle Williamson
  – Masielle Otero
  – Goizeder Victoria Azua Barrios
  – Lê Minh Phượng

Notes

Did not compete
  – Massika Benakila
  – Klara Medkova (ill the day before she was to leave for Japan)
  – Rita Lamah
  – Marna Haugen

Country Changes
 Yugoslavia changed its name to Serbia & Montenegro.

References

External links
 Pageantopolis – Miss International 2003

2003
2003 beauty pageants
2003 in Tokyo
Beauty pageants in Japan